Sepp Riff (17 February 1928 – 12 February 2000) was an Austrian cinematographer. He worked on a number of films and television series, including the 1955 comedy film His Daughter is Called Peter.

Selected filmography
 His Daughter is Called Peter (1955)
 Forest Liesel (1956)
 Her Corporal (1956)

References

Bibliography 
 Fritsche, Maria. Homemade Men in Postwar Austrian Cinema: Nationhood, Genre and Masculinity. Berghahn Books, 2013.

External links 
 

1928 births
2000 deaths
Austrian cinematographers